Wayuu typically refers to the Wayuu people, an indigenous people of Colombia and Venezuela.

Other uses include:
 Wayuu language or Wayuunaiki, the Arawakan language spoken by Wayuu people
 Wayuu: La niña de Maracaibo, a 2012 Venezuelan crime film

See also
 Wayuunaiki (newspaper), a bilingual monthly newspaper from Venezuela
 Wayu language, a Sino-Tibetan language of Nepal
 Wayu Tuka, a district in Ethiopia